Stratford High School is a public high school located in Stratford, Wisconsin. It serves grades 9 through 12, and is the only high school in the Stratford School District.

History
Stratford High School was built in 1907, with additions in 1936 and 1953.

Academics
Advanced Placement classes are offered at Stratford.

Athletics
Stratford's athletic teams are named the Tigers and compete in the Marawood Conference. Tigers football teams have won state championships in 1986, 2003, 2004, 2005, 2006, 2007 and 2008. Tigers wrestling teams won state championships in 2017 and 2018.

Notable alumni
Derek Kraus, NASCAR driver

References

Educational institutions established in 1907
1907 establishments in Wisconsin
High schools in Wisconsin
Schools in Marathon County, Wisconsin